"Summer Moved On" is a song by Norwegian band a-ha, released as the group's first single in more than six years. The lead single from their sixth studio album, Minor Earth Major Sky (2000), the song was released in Europe on 25 March 2000 and was given a UK release on 22 May 2000. It was originally hastily written after a-ha agreed to a one-time reunion at the Nobel Peace Prize concert in 1998. The song became a number-one radio hit in much of Europe, including topping the chart in the band's native Norway, and the band has continued to record and perform together to significant international success, though that success has not extended to the United States, where their recent work has gone unreleased. The song sold 2,500,000 copies worldwide. On the song, Morten Harket achieved the European record for the longest note held in a top 40 pop song; Harket sustains a chest voice note for 20.2 seconds (eight measures).

Critical reception
The song received positive reviews from music critics. A reviewer from Evening Herald described it as a "soaring and powerful ballad". Sylvia Patterson from NME wrote, "And now they're back! Swoon! And they're still REALLY GOOD, if not quite The Revolution. Demolition string-quaver quiver-pop-a-ruddy-kimbo as Morten trills 'staaaaay!!!' and a thousand moonbeams dart from black skies of nu-pop baloney on a clifftop everglade under a wind-machine in Rio like 'NSync and all the rest of it never happened. Or, if you like, it's a bit James Bond, 'cos they did the James Bond theme tune once, they were that good. Sigh."

Track listings

 CD: WEA./8573 82331-2 Europe
 "Summer Moved On" (album edit) – 4:36
 "Barely Hanging On" (album version) – 3:51
* It states that it features the "album version" of "Barely Hanging On", but this song has actually been remixed for the album.

 CD: WEA./3984 29692-2 Europe
 "Summer Moved On" (radio edit) – 4:06
 "Summer Moved On" (album edit) – 4:36
 "Barely Hanging On" – 3:51
 "Summer Moved On" (remix) – 6:00
* It states that it features the "album version" of "Barely Hanging On", but this song has actually been remixed for the album.

 CD: WEA./CDWP009 Promo Brazil
 "Summer Moved On" (radio version) – 4:06
 "Summer Moved On" (album version) – 4:36
 "Summer Moved On" (remix) – 6:00
 "Summer Moved On" (remix edit)

 CD: We Love Music./0602527682198 Germany
 "Summer Moved On" (live) – 4:58
 "Scoundrel Days" (live) – 4:20
* Both tracks taken From the live DVD "Ending on a High Note – The Final Concert"

Charts

Weekly charts

Year-end charts

Release history

MTV Unplugged appearance 
In 2017, A-ha appeared on the television series MTV Unplugged and played and recorded acoustic versions of many of their popular songs for the album MTV Unplugged – Summer Solstice in Giske, Norway, including "Summer Moved On" (featuring Alison Moyet).

References

2000 singles
2000 songs
A-ha songs
English-language Norwegian songs
Number-one singles in Norway
Songs written by Paul Waaktaar-Savoy
Warner Music Group singles